British Journal of Political Science is a quarterly peer-reviewed academic journal covering all aspects of political science.

Abstracting and indexing 
The journal is abstracted and indexed in EBSCOhost, International Political Science Abstracts, Current Contents/Social & Behavioral Sciences, PAIS International, Social Sciences Citation Index, CSA Worldwide Political Science Abstracts, International Bibliography of Periodical Literature and International Bibliography of Book Reviews of Scholarly Literature and Social Sciences. According to the Journal Citation Reports, the journal has a 2018 impact factor of 4.292, ranking it 4th out of 176 journals in the category "Political Science".

Awards
In association with the British Academy and the Cambridge University Press, the journal awards the Brian Barry Prize in Political Science. The winning essay is then published in this journal.

Notable staff
 Sarah Birch, co-editor from 2002 to 2011
 Robert E. Goodin, co-editor

See also 
 List of political science journals

References

External links 
 

Political science journals
Quarterly journals
English-language journals
Publications established in 1971
Cambridge University Press academic journals
Political science in the United Kingdom
1971 establishments in the United Kingdom